The MOWAG Eagle is a wheeled armored vehicle designed by the Swiss MOWAG corporation. It has gone through several generations of development. The current vehicle, introduced in November 2003, is the Eagle IV, which is based on the Duro IIIP chassis. The original MOWAG Eagle used the chassis and running gear of the United States Humvee, while the Eagle II and Eagle III use the chassis and running gear of the Humvee ECV. A Prototype is now part of the Military Museum Full. The MOWAG Eagle IV and V used the chassis and running gear of the Mowag Duro.

A modular 6×6 variant that was developed for an Australian Army tender made its market debut at Eurosatory 2012.

Cost 
The Danish Army ordered 36 Eagle V in four different configurations (patrol, electronic warfare, support and reconnaissance) in May 2017.  According to public records from the Danish Parliament, the acquisition cost of the 36 EAGLE 5 Vehicles is DKK 233.6 mill. (approx. USD 35 mill) including Government Furnished Equipment (GFE) (driving cameras, radios, weapons mounts). This translates into an average price per vehicle of USD 972,000. According to the records the sustainment cost of the 36-vehicle fleet is estimated at DKK 116.1 mill. (approx. DKK 17.3 mill.)  over a 15 year period.

Military Operators

Eagle I, II, III 
  Swiss Army – A total of 329 Eagle I and II are in use as light armored reconnaissance vehicles (Aufklärungsfahrzeug), armed with a 7.5mm Pz Mg 51/71 machine gun and fitted with thermal imaging and radio equipment. They are known respectively as Aufklärungsfahrzeug 93 and Aufklärungsfahrzeug 97. 120 Eagle III have been acquired as mobile artillery observer vehicles in 2003, with substantial improvements made to communications and surveillance equipment (yet lacking the machine gun of previous versions).
  Danish Army – 36 Eagle I, known as Spejdervogn M/95. Nowadays, the M/95 is used without the original MKB-2 turret.

Eagle IV 
  
 Swiss Army – 4 vehicles armed with 12.7mm Browning M2 machineguns and 76mm grenade launcher. To be used as reconnaissance APCs in peacekeeping missions in Bosnia and Kosovo 
  Danish Army – 90 
  
 German Army – 495 (475 have been ordered so far + 20 vehicles as armored ambulance)

Eagle V 
  The Danish Army ordered 36 Eagle V in four different configurations (patrol, electronic warfare, support and reconnaissance) in May 2017. Deliveries are expected in 2018 and 2019 with final operation from 2019.
  The German Armed Forces ordered 176 Eagle V in May 2013 and 80 Eagle V 6x6 armored ambulance vehicles in March 2020.
  The Swiss Armed Forces ordered:
 100 Eagle V 6x6 TASYS armoured reconnaissance vehicles on 5 December 2019
 4 Eagle V 4x4 ordered to be used as EOD. One is effectively in use with the Zurich Kanton Police, based at the airport. One is being used by the Swisscoy mission with the KFOR in Kosovo.
  The Luxembourg Armed Forces ordered 4 Eagle V 6x6 ambulances in 2021. In September 2022 an additional order of 80 Eagle V 4x4 through the NSPA was placed. It is configured as CLRV command liaison and reconnaissance vehicles an will replace the Humvee and the ATF Dingo. The mission equipment will be common to its neighbours, French and Belgian VBMR Griffon. It will be fitted with the RWS deFNder Medium from FN Herstal, the information and combat system Scorpion (SICS from ATOS), the CONTACT radio system SDR from Thales and the anti-ied jammer BARAGE from Thales Belgium. It will be delivered between December 2024 and July 2026. The acquisition is worth € 226.6 M. The acquisition and the Life Cycle Cost of the vehicle and the systems fitted, including the logistics for 15-20 years has a cost cap of €367 million.

Civilian Operators

Eagle IV 
, German Federal Police – 10 vehicles in use. It was ordered in 2011 to be used in Afghanistan. The vehicles came back from deployment in 2015, and since then have replaced the Sonderwagen SW4 Thyssen TM in their use to protect airports. 

 3 vehicles at the Berlin Brandenburg Airport
 3 vehicles at the Frankfurt Airport
 3 vehicles at the Munich Airport
 1 vehicles at the Stuttgart Airport

The Federal Police also uses Mercedes Enok for this mission, but it wasn't adapted to be used in Afghanistan. 

The Federal Police uses their Mowag Eagle also for the protection of international events such as the G20 in 2017 in Hamburg. 

-Zurich Cantonal Police has 1 Eagle IV  which is located at Zurich Airport

Gallery

References

External links 

 Manufacturer's homepage
 DanskPanser.dk - Eagle I
 DanskPanser.dk - Eagle IV
 Prime Portal - Eagle III walk-around
 Prime Portal - Eagle IV walk-around

Military trucks
Off-road vehicles
Armoured fighting vehicles of the post–Cold War period
Military vehicles of Switzerland
Military light utility vehicles
Military vehicles introduced in the 2000s